Albert Lowagie (born 22 September 1929) is a Belgian sprinter. He competed in the men's 400 metres at the 1952 Summer Olympics.

References

1929 births
Living people
Athletes (track and field) at the 1952 Summer Olympics
Belgian male sprinters
Olympic athletes of Belgium
Sportspeople from Ypres